The 2018–19 Northern Arizona Lumberjacks women's basketball team represents Northern Arizona University during the 2018–19 NCAA Division I women's basketball season. The Lumberjacks, led by second year head coach Loree Payne, play their home games at the Walkup Skydome. They are members of the Big Sky Conference.

Roster

Schedule

|-
!colspan=9 style=| Non-conference regular season

|-
!colspan=9 style=| Big Sky regular season

|-
!colspan=9 style=| Big Sky Women's Tournament

See also
2018–19 Northern Arizona Lumberjacks men's basketball team

References

Northern Arizona
Northern Arizona Lumberjacks women's basketball seasons